Amphiporus is a genus of nemerteans belonging to the family Amphiporidae.

The genus has cosmopolitan distribution.

Species

Species:

Amphiporus adriaticus 
Amphiporus albicans 
Amphiporus lactifloreus

References

Monostilifera
Nemertea genera